Massopoda is a clade of sauropodomorph dinosaurs which lived during the Late Triassic to Late Cretaceous epochs. It was named by paleontologist Adam M. Yates of the University of the Witwatersrand in 2007. Massopoda is a stem-based taxon, defined as all animals more closely related to Saltasaurus loricatus than to Plateosaurus engelhardti.

Classification
Yates assigned the Massopoda to Plateosauria. Within the clade, he assigned the families Massospondylidae (which includes the relatively well-known dinosaur Massospondylus) and Riojasauridae (which includes Riojasaurus) as well as the Sauropoda.

The following is a cladogram from an analysis presented by Oliver W. M. Rauhut and colleagues in 2020:

References

 
Sauropodomorphs
Tetrapod unranked clades
Late Triassic first appearances
Maastrichtian extinctions